IAF Camp (short for Indian Air Force Camp) is a village in the Nicobar district of Andaman and Nicobar Islands, India. It is located in the Car Nicobar tehsil. The Car Nicobar Air Force Base is located here.

Demographics 

According to the 2011 census of India, IAF Camp has 31 households. The effective literacy rate (i.e. the literacy rate of population excluding children aged 6 and below) is 100%.

References 

Villages in Car Nicobar tehsil